Sungai Pelong is a small town in Petaling District, Selangor, Malaysia.

Petaling District
Towns in Selangor